United Nations Security Council Resolution 1694, adopted unanimously on July 13, 2006, after recalling all previous resolutions on the situation in Liberia and West Africa, including Resolution 1667 (2006), the Council increased the size of the police component of the United Nations Mission in Liberia (UNMIL) and reduced its military component.

The Chapter VII resolution increased the police component by 125 personnel and reduced the size of the military component by the same number. The measure was taken after a report from the Secretary-General Kofi Annan recommended changes to UNMIL's configuration.

See also
 List of United Nations Security Council Resolutions 1601 to 1700 (2005–2006)
 Second Liberian Civil War

References

External links
 
Text of the Resolution at undocs.org

 1694
 1694
2006 in Liberia
July 2006 events